The  system, more commonly called simply Five Mountain System, was a network of state-sponsored Chan (Zen) Buddhist temples created in China during the Southern Song (1127–1279). The term "mountain" in this context means "temple" or "monastery", and was adopted because many monasteries were built on isolated mountains. The system originated in India and was later adopted also in Japan during the late Kamakura period (1185–1333).

In Japan, the ten existing "Five Mountain" temples (five in Kyoto and five in Kamakura, Kanagawa) were both protected and controlled by the shogunate. In time, they became a sort of governmental bureaucracy that helped the Ashikaga shogunate stabilize the country during the turbulent Nanboku-chō period. Below the ten Gozan temples there were ten so-called  temples, followed by another network called . The terms Gozan and Five Mountain System are used both for the ten temples at the top and for the Five Mountain System network in general, including the Jissetsu and the Shozan.

There used to be in Kamakura a parallel "Five Mountain System" of nunneries called , of which the famous Tōkei-ji is the only survivor.

The system in China 
At the time of the Song dynasty, Chan (Japanese Zen) was the dominant form of monasticism and had considerable imperial support. This forced it to assume certain features and develop a network of monastic offices and rituals wanted by the state. Around the 12th century, this tendency to monastic wealth and imperial patronage became even more pronounced with the creation by direct imperial order in South China of the Five Mountains and Ten Temples System (五山十刹, wushan shicha) during the late Southern Song (1127–1279). It was a system of state-sponsored temples and monasteries built to pray to the gods for the dynasty and the state, which was threatened by enemies from Northern China. The system had at its top five famous temples and ten lesser ones immediately below. Officials chose both the five temples of the top tier, and the chief priest that ruled over them.

The five famous monasteries ('five mountains') were:

 Lingyin Temple (灵隐寺, Lingyin si) on Lingyin mountain, Hang prefecture, Qiantang county
 Jingci Temple (净慈寺, Jingci si) on Nanping mountain, Hang prefecture, Qiantang county
 Jingshan Temple (径山寺, Jingshan si) on Jing mountain, Hang prefecture, Lin'an county
 Tiantong Temple (天童寺, Tiantong si) on Tiantong mountain, Ming prefecture, Yin county
 Ayuwang Temple (阿育王寺, Ayuwang si) on Ayuwang mountain, Ming prefecture, Yin county

The system was devised specifically to bureaucratize and control the power of the Chan temples, a power which had been growing with the years and worried the central government. The consequent submission of the Chan network to imperial power and its goals is evident in later codes, particularly in the Baizhang qinggui compiled in 1336. Because the conquering Mongols financially supported Chan, the code emphasizes prayers for the emperor and the monastic ancestors The emperor is even described as a nirmanakaya, or incarnate Buddha. The complex monastic bureaucracy described by the code clearly reflects the imperial administration with its eastern and western ranks. The code has been in continuous use ever since, and not only within Chan Buddhism.

The system in Japan 
Introduced to Japan by the Hōjō regency, after an initial hostility from older and established Buddhist sects, it prospered thanks to the support of the country's military rulers in Kamakura first and Kyoto later. In the final version of the system, Kamakura's Five Mountains were, from the first-ranked to the last, Kenchō-ji, Engaku-ji,  Jufuku-ji, Jōchi-ji and Jōmyō-ji. Kyoto's Five Mountains, created later by the Ashikaga shogunate after the collapse of the Kamakura regime, were Tenryū-ji, Shōkoku-ji, Kennin-ji, Tōfuku-ji and  Manju-ji. Above them all was the huge Nanzen-ji temple. Below the top tier there was a nationwide capillary network of smaller temples that allowed its influence to be felt everywhere.

Function
The system was adopted to promote Zen in Japan however, in Japan as it had already happened in China, it was controlled and used by the country's ruling class for its own administrative and political ends. The Gozan system allowed the temples at the top to function as de facto ministries, using their nationwide network of temples for the distribution of government laws and norms, and for the monitoring of local conditions for their military superiors. The Hōjō first, and the Ashikaga later were therefore able to disguise their power under a religious mask, while monks and priests worked for the government as translators, diplomats and advisers. To the Rinzai sect, the collaboration with the shogunate brought wealth, influence and political clout.

History 
The system had come to Japan at a time when Kamakura's five great Zen temples were already known as the Five Mountains, and it unified in one organization all the great temples of the dominant Zen schools of the time. It thus institutionalized a large and very important part of the Rinzai school, bringing to it the protection, but also the control of the state. The whole network of temples was supervised by a state bureaucracy created specifically for the task.

Below them were the so-called Ten Temples, or Jissetsu, with at the bottom other temples collectively known as Shozan.

The Gozan temples were dominated mainly by the Rinzai Zen schools. The  branch of the Sōtō Zen school however belonged to the Gozan system too.

Under their masters' patronage, the Five Mountain temples gradually became centers of learning and developed a characteristic literature called the Japanese Literature of the Five Mountains. During the Japanese Middle Ages, its scholars exerted a far-reaching influence on the internal political affairs of the country. The system put great value in a strong orientation towards Chinese Zen, Chinese philosophy and Chinese literature. The organization's scholars had a close relationship with the Ming imperial dynasty, had a pervasive influence in many cultural fields and played an important role in importing Neo-Confucianism (particularly as far as the shushigaku (朱子学) is concerned) from China to Japan.

Birth of the Gozan 
At the end of the Kamakura period (1333) the four temples of Kennin-ji, Kenchō-ji, Engaku-ji and Jufuku-ji, were already known as the Gozan, but not much is otherwise known about the system, its structure and the hierarchical order.

The first official recognition of the system came from Emperor Go-Daigo during the brief Kenmu Restoration (1333–1336). Go-Daigo added the Kyoto Gozan to the existing temples in Kamakura with Daitoku-ji and Nanzen-ji together at the top as number 1, followed by Kennin-ji and Tōfuku-ji. At this point in time, in spite of their name, the Gozan were not five but four in both cities. At the beginning of Muromachi period, they became five in Kyoto later, when Ashikaga Takauji built Tenryū-ji in memory of Go-Daigo.

The early ranking system 
The first explicit formulation of a clear Gozan ranking system dates to the year 1341.

The system was modified again many times according to the preferences of the government and of the Imperial Household.

The Ankoku-ji system 

From their base cities of Kamakura and Kyoto, the twin Five Mountains Systems had great influence over the entire country.

These were dedicated to the memory of the dead of the Genkō War of 1331-3, war in which Emperor Go-Daigo broke the power of the Hōjō clan. Emperor Kōgon promulgated in 1345 an edict for the deployment of the new system, and from 1362 to 1367 the temples and the pagodas were built in 66 provinces.

The Ankoku-ji network was tightly controlled by Ashikaga shugo (Governors) and was associated with the Gozan system.  The Rishō-tō were direct property of the Gozan, with the exception of those associated with the Ashikaga, which were connected to powerful temples of non-Rinzai schools, mainly of the Shingon, Tendai and Risshū sects.

Both brothers died early (Tadayoshi in 1352, according to the Taiheiki of poisoning, and Takauji in 1358 of cancer), so they couldn't couldn't oversee the system's creation until its end.

The system was completed under Ashikaga Yoshimitsu when he was 10 years old. During his father Ashikaga Yoshiakira's regency, who was until his death busy with the war with the Southern Court, the Ashikaga governors had become however strong and independent warlords. Even though as a consequence the provinces didn't accept any more the oversight of the Gozan and of the shogunate, the Gozan/Ankoku-ji system remained a valuable instrument to control the various Zen sects.

The final form of the Gozan system 

After the completion of Shōkoku-ji by Yoshimitsu in 1386 a new ranking system was created with Nanzen-ji at the top and in a class of its own. Nanzen-ji had the title of "First Temple of The Land" and played a supervising role.

This structure then remained more or less unchanged for the rest of the system's history.

The Jissetsu 
The Jissetsu, second tier of the Five Mountain system, was created to be hierarchically under the Gozan, but developed slowly towards an independent system. The temples of this rank were in general powerful institutions of great prestige and had to help the military government financially and in other ways.

Nothing else is known however about the character and structure of the system at the time.

After many changes, in 1386 the system was divided in half between the Kantō Jissetsu, that is the temples under the Kamakura Gozan, and the Kyoto Jissetsu, that is the temples under the Kyoto Gozan.

 

Later, the term Jissetsu lost its original meaning and became just a rank. Consequently, at the end of the Middle Ages it included over 60 temples.

The Shozan
The third and lowest tier was that of the so-called Shozan, sometimes also called  as the corresponding tier of the Chinese state-sponsored temple system. These last terms are however normally used only in writing for elegance. The term in China meant "first in rank" in a certain province, but in Japan this meaning was lost.

We know that in 1321 Sagami province's  and in 1230 Higo Province's  were part of the system, which therefore must be older. More temples from all parts of the country were added later during the Kemmu restoration. Unlike the Gozan and the Jissetsu, the Shozan were not ordered hierarchically and there were no limits to their number, which consequently grew until more than 230 temples belonged to the system. A Zen chief priest (a ) in his career would usually rise from the Shozan to the Jissetsu and finally to the Gozan.

The Rinka
Apart from the Gozan temples, there were also many others in the provinces called , among them Sōtō's Eihei-ji founded by Dōgen, and Rinzai's Daitoku-ji, Myōshin-ji and Kōgen-ji, which were not under the direct control of the state. During Japan's Middle Ages, the Rinka monasteries were Zen's other main branch. Unlike the Five Mountain temples, they placed little emphasis on Chinese culture, were run by less well-educated monks who preferred zazen and kōan to poetry. Rinka Zen prospered among the lower layers of the warrior, merchant and peasant castes, who saw religion as a means to achieve simple worldly goals such as profits and exorcisms.

The very lack of political connection which had hampered them at the beginning of their history was however the reason why they prospered later. During the slow decline of Ashikaga authority, and particularly after the catastrophic Ōnin war, in the latter half of the Muromachi period, because the Rinka had a close relationship with local warlords, they became progressively more important and influential than the Gozan, which followed their Ashikaga masters in their decline. A measure of the success of the Rinka is given by the fact that today's Sōtō and Rinzai sects emerged from Rinka Zen.

See also 
 For an explanation of terms concerning Japanese Buddhism, Japanese Buddhist art, and Japanese Buddhist temple architecture, see the Glossary of Japanese Buddhism.

References

Sources
William Theodore De Bary, Donald Keene, George Tanabe, Paul Varley (2005), Sources of Japanese tradition, Vol. 1: From Earliest Times to 1600, Columbia University Press, 

 The Gozan Temples, by Michael Dunn, The Japan Times, August 23, 2007, retrieved on July 4, 2008
 
 Iwanami Nihonshi Jiten (岩波日本史辞典), CD-Rom Version. Iwanami Shoten, 1999-2001 (in Japanese)
 
 

Rinzai school
Kyoto
Buddhist temples in Kamakura, Kanagawa
Rinzai temples
Zen Buddhist monasteries
Zen temples
Buddhist monasticism
Buddhist temples in Kyoto
Buddhism in the Muromachi period